Hoàng Cầm may refer to:
 Hoàng Cầm (poet) (1922–2010), a Vietnamese poet
 Hoàng Cầm (general) (born 1920), of the Vietnam People's Army
 Hoàng Cầm stove, a type of kitchen stove that was widely used by the Vietnam People's Army and named after a cook who invented the device